The qualifying rounds for the 2001–02 UEFA Champions League began on 11 July 2001. In total, there were three qualifying rounds which provided 16 clubs to join the group stage.

Teams

Notes

First qualifying round
The draw for this round was performed on 22 June 2001 in Geneva, Switzerland.

Seeding

Summary

|}

Matches

Sheriff Tiraspol won 3–0 on aggregate.

Torpedo Kutaisi won 1–0 on aggregate.

Bohemians won 3–0 on aggregate.

Skonto won 6–2 on aggregate.

Levski Sofia won 4–0 on aggregate.

Slavia Mozyr won 5–0 on aggregate.

Haka won 5–0 on aggregate.

1–1 on aggregate; Sloga Jugomagnat won on away goals.

2–2 on aggregate; Vllaznia Shkodër won on away goals.

Barry Town won 3–0 on aggregate.

Second qualifying round
The draw for this round was performed on 22 June 2001 in Geneva, Switzerland.

Seeding

Notes

Summary

|}
Notes

Matches

Haka won 3–1 on aggregate. The second leg originally ended 4–0 to Maccabi Haifa but they were later ruled to have forfeited the match after fielding suspended player Walid Badir; Haka were therefore awarded the second leg 3–0.

Shakhtar Donetsk won 4–2 on aggregate.

Red Star Belgrade won 3–2 on aggregate.

0–0 on aggregate; Hajduk Split won on penalties

Porto won 9–3 on aggregate.

Rangers won 6–1 on aggregate.

Galatasaray won 6–1 on aggregate.

Inter Bratislava won 2–0 on aggregate.

Anderlecht won 6–1 on aggregate.

Copenhagen won 4–2 on aggregate.

1–1 on aggregate; Levski Sofia won on away goals.

Wisła Kraków won 3–1 on aggregate.

Halmstad won 4–1 on aggregate.

Steaua București won 5–1 on aggregate.

Third qualifying round
The draw for this round was performed on 20 July 2001 in Nyon, Switzerland.

Seeding

Notes

Summary

|}
Notes

Matches

Borussia Dortmund won 5–1 on aggregate.

Lokomotiv Moscow won 3–2 on aggregate. The second leg was annulled and replayed after UEFA admitted a referee mistake as Lokomotiv player was not expelled after receiving two yellow cards.

Dynamo Kyiv won 5–3 on aggregate.

Liverpool won 9–1 on aggregate.

Mallorca won 2–1 on aggregate.

Bayer Leverkusen won 3–0 on aggregate.

Barcelona won 5–3 on aggregate.

Lazio won 5–3 on aggregate.

Rosenborg won 7–3 on aggregate.

Anderlecht won 4–3 on aggregate.

Panathinaikos won 3–1 on aggregate.

Galatasaray won 3–2 on aggregate.

Celtic won 3–2 on aggregate.

Porto won 5–4 on aggregate.

Lille won 2–1 on aggregate.

Fenerbahçe won 2–1 on aggregate.

Notes

References

External links
 2001–02 season at UEFA website

Qualifying Rounds
2001-02